Samora Machel Bridge is a bridge in Mozambique across the Zambezi River. It is named after Samora Machel, the former President of Mozambique.

It links Tete, the capital of Tete Province, to Moatize. The bridge also connects the countries of Zimbabwe and Malawi.

See also
 List of crossings of the Zambezi River

References

Bridges in Mozambique
Bridges over the Zambezi River
Tete, Mozambique
Buildings and structures in Tete Province